Fighting for the Earth is the debut album by American heavy metal band Warrior. It was originally released in 1985 and was re-issued by Metal Blade in 1991 (North America), Toshiba-EMI in 1993 (Japan) as part of the Burrn! Legendary Masters series, and by NL Distribution in 2008 (Europe).

Critical reception

Fighting for the Earth was ranked number 275 in Rock Hard magazine's book of The 500 Greatest Rock & Metal Albums of All Time in 2005.

Track listing 
All songs written and composed by Joe Floyd, except where noted:

Personnel 
Band members
Parramore McCarty – vocals
Joe Floyd – guitars
Tommy Asakawa – guitars
Bruce Turgon – bass (credited but does not play on the record)
Jimmy Volpe – drums (credited but does not play on the record)

Additional musicians
Rick Bennett – bass, keyboards on all tracks
Liam Jason – drums on all tracks

Production
Doug Rider – producer, engineer
David Thoener – mixing
Brian Scheuble, Peggy McCreary, Ray Leonard – assistant engineers
Bob Ludwig – mastering at Masterdisk, New York

References

1985 debut albums
Albums recorded at Sound City Studios